The discography of Australian contemporary R&B, pop music and stage and screen recording artist Debra Byrne consists of five studio albums, one soundtrack album and eleven singles.

Studio albums

Soundtrack albums

Singles

Soundtrack appearances

Other appearances

See also
 Young Talent Time

References

Discographies of Australian artists
Rhythm and blues discographies
Pop music discographies